The 1997 Men's European Volleyball Championship was the 20th edition of the event, organized by Europe's governing volleyball body, the Confédération Européenne de Volleyball. It was hosted  from September 6 to September 14 in two cities in the Netherlands – Den Bosch and Eindhoven –.

Qualification

The top four placed teams from the 1995 edition of the Men's European Volleyball Championship — Italy, Yugoslavia, Netherlands (also host) and Bulgaria — were automatically qualified for the 1997 edition. The other teams had to qualify in 1996.

Teams

Group A – Den Bosch

Group B – Eindhoven

Squads

Preliminary round

Group A

Saturday September 6

Sunday September 7

Monday September 8

Wednesday September 10

Thursday September 11

Group B

Saturday September 6

Sunday September 7

Monday September 8

Wednesday September 10

Thursday September 11

Final round

Friday September 13 — Semi-finals

Saturday September 14 — Bronze Medal Match

Saturday September 14 — Gold Medal Match

Friday September 13 — Classification Matches

Saturday September 14 — Seventh Place Match

Saturday September 14 — Fifth Place Match

Final ranking

References
 CEV Results
Results

Men's European Volleyball Championships
E
Volleyball Championship
V
September 1997 sports events in Europe